The Two of Them is a 1977 Hungarian-French drama film directed by Márta Mészáros.

Plot summary

Cast 
 Marina Vlady - Mária
 Lili Monori - Juli Bodnár
 Jan Nowicki - János Bodnár
 Zsuzsa Czinkóczi - Zsuzsi Bodnár

References

External links 
 

1977 drama films
1977 films
Films directed by Márta Mészáros
Hungarian drama films
French drama films
1970s French films